The historic Moose Jaw Court House building is located in downtown Moose Jaw, Saskatchewan, Canada. The building is 2 stories; making use of steel construction, hydraulic-pressed brick and Bedford Stone trimmed with Indiana Limestone. The building is the oldest continuously functioning provincial court house in the province. The building has been designated a National Historic Site of Canada and a Provincial Heritage Property.

References

External links
 Details on Building

Buildings and structures in Moose Jaw
Government buildings completed in 1909
National Historic Sites in Saskatchewan
Darling and Pearson buildings
Neoclassical architecture in Canada
Courthouses in Canada
Canadian Register of Historic Places in Saskatchewan